Parliamentary elections were held in Northern Cyprus on 6 May 1990. The opposition Republican Turkish Party, Communal Liberation Party, Democratic People's Party, Social Democratic Party and New Dawn Party ran in an alliance known as the Party for Democratic Struggle to oppose the ruling National Unity Party (UBP). The UBP received 54.7% of the vote and won 34 of the 50 seats, whilst the DMP took the remaining 16 seats.

Results

Aftermath
Following the election, the 12 MPs who were members of the Republican Turkish Party and Communal Liberation Party started boycotting the Assembly of the Republic, claiming that Turkey had putting money into the election campaign to support the government. Following by-elections for the 12 vacant seats in October 1991, they were replaced in the Assembly by UBP members, who then held 46 of the 50 seats.

References

Northern Cyprus
1990 in Northern Cyprus
Elections in Northern Cyprus
May 1990 events in Europe